Jack Roberts (born 1979) is an American actor, writer, and producer from Tulsa, Oklahoma.  He is a graduate of The New School.  He's best known for his Duncan Christopher in The Rock 'n' Roll Dreams of Duncan Christopher.

References

External links
 https://www.imdb.com/name/nm1985200/

1979 births
Living people
Male actors from Tulsa, Oklahoma
The New School alumni
American male film actors
Writers from Tulsa, Oklahoma